The Whitall Tatum Company or Whitall Tatum (1806–1938) was one of the first glass factories in the United States.

History
Located in Millville, New Jersey, it was in operation from 1806 through 1938. The location was ideal for making glass because silica-based sand is plentiful in southern New Jersey, the Maurice River flowing through Millville provided a source of water, and plentiful forests provided energy for industrial processes. The Millville glass works was founded by James Lee and went through several changes of ownership. In 1838, John M. Whitall became a partner in the business. He lived in Philadelphia and worked at the company's headquarters there. In 1845, after his brother Israel Franklin Whitall joined, the firm became Whitall, Brother & Company. Later, Edward Tatum also joined the partnership and in 1857 the name was again changed to Whitall Tatum & Company and later in 1901 to Whitall Tatum Company. I.F. Whitall and Edward Tatum headed the company after John M. Whitall retired in 1865, and the ownership was passed to their descendants.

Whitall Tatum produced bottles, jars, and vials throughout much of the 19th century. Antique bottle collectors prize the Whitall Tatum druggist, perfume, chemical, reagent bottles, and other types of bottles. The company developed several innovations in formulas used to make the glass, and in the manufacturing methods for bottles. At first, bottles were cast in metal molds, which left a casting line, and later ceramic and wood casts were developed for flint glass which allowed the glass to be molded without a casting line. Glass types included flint glass, blue and green glass, and artistic colored swirls, used for decoration and paperweights often made by the glass workers during their lunch hour.

Whitall Tatum mass-produced special-order prescription bottles for hundreds of pharmacies, such as Smith & Hodgson in downtown Philadelphia, embossed with their names and addresses and also marked "W.T. & Co." on the base. These mostly date from 1875 up to 1900. In 1901, the company name was changed to Whitall Tatum Company and the base marking became "W.T.CO.", and for a decade from the 1920s on, the trademark became a "W" and "T" inside a triangle.

Insulators 

Whitall Tatum entered the insulator manufacturing market in 1922, mass-producing them for use on power and communications lines across the country. Armstrong Cork Corporation purchased Whitall-Tatum in 1938, continuing insulator production under the Armstrong trademark. Production continued after a 1969 purchase by Kerr Glass Manufacturing Corporation until about 1976. One final run of Kerr DP-1s was manufactured in 1978. These particular units have flat domes, and are rather scarce among insulators found "in the wild".

The former Whitall Tatum plant in Millville was purchased by a series of companies, including the American Can Company. Ball-Foster purchased the factory in 1995, and in 1999, after 193 years of nearly continuous glass production, the factory was shut down. The buildings where the WT glass furnaces sat have been demolished.

References 

 
 http://www.cr.nps.gov/history/online_books/nj2/chap5.htm
 https://web.archive.org/web/20070927130740/http://www.ettc.net/njarts/details.cfm?ID=911
 News article in the "Bridgeton News", January 3, 2007 on the demolition of the Whitall-Tatum, Kerr, Ball-Foster glass works buildings.
 Richard Wentzel, chapter in "Insulators: A History and Guide to North American Glass Pintype Insulators" by John & Carol McDougald (1990).
 John M. Whitall: The Story of His Life, by his daughter Hannah W. Smith. Philadelphia, 1879.

Glassmaking companies of the United States
Defunct glassmaking companies
Companies based in Cumberland County, New Jersey
Manufacturing companies established in 1806
Manufacturing companies disestablished in 1938
1806 establishments in New Jersey
1938 disestablishments in New Jersey
1938 mergers and acquisitions
Defunct manufacturing companies based in New Jersey